Tanimachi Yonchome Station (谷町四丁目駅, -eki) is a subway station of the Osaka Metro located in Chūō-ku, Osaka, Japan, and the station is also called "".

Lines

 (T23)
 (C18)

Layout
There are two side platforms with two tracks for the Tanimachi Line on the second basement, and two side platforms with two tracks for the Chūō Line over the Tanimachi Line.  Passages are located between the south of the platforms for the Tanimachi Line and the west of the platforms for the Chūō Line.

Tanimachi Line

Chūō Line

Surroundings
NHK Osaka Broadcasting Station
Osaka Museum of History
Osaka Prefectural Government Building
Osaka Prefecturel Police Head Building
Osaka Castle
National Hospital Organization Osaka National Hospital
Osaka International Cancer Institute

External links

 Official Site - Tanimachi Line 
 Official Site - Tanimachi Line 
 Official Site - Chūō Line 
 Official Site - Chūō Line 

Chūō-ku, Osaka
Osaka Metro stations
Railway stations in Japan opened in 1967